Joseph, Joe or Joey Ryan may refer to:

Sportspeople
 Joseph Ryan (rower) (fl. 1904), American Olympic rower
 Joe Ryan (footballer) (1917–1986), Australian rules footballer
 Joe Ryan (baseball) (born 1996), baseball player
 Joey Ryan (wrestler) (born 1979), American wrestler

Others
 Joseph O'Connell Ryan (1841–1938), Canadian politician, barrister and editor
 Joe Ryan (politician) (1936–2016), American politician and businessman
 Joey Ryan, member of American duo The Milk Carton Kids
 Shiny Joe Ryan (born 1987), Irish-Australian singer-songwriter
 Joseph T. Ryan (1913–2000), American prelate of the Roman Catholic Church